The community of Britons in Egypt includes British migrants in Egypt, as well as Egyptian citizens of British descent. In 2006, the Institute for Public Policy Research estimated that 14,000 British people were residents of Egypt, including 182 pensioners.

See also
Egypt – United Kingdom relations
Egyptians in the United Kingdom

References

Egypt
British diaspora in Africa
Ethnic groups in Egypt
European diaspora in Egypt